Quxuroba (also, Kukhuroba and Kukhur-Kishlag) is a village and municipality in the Qusar Rayon of Azerbaijan.  It has a population of 1,980.

References 

Populated places in Qusar District